Barrie South GO Station is a train and bus station on the GO Transit Barrie line, located in Barrie, Ontario, Canada.

Barrie Transit buses provide public transit access to the rest of the city. As of January 2012, the station is used by about 700 passengers per day, up from 350 at the time of its opening.

History
Construction of the station began in June 2007 and the station began operating on December 17, 2007, with the first train departing at 05:43 that day.

The station's opening restored GO train service to Barrie, which had been eliminated in the 1990s.

Services
Barrie South station has weekday train service consisting of 7 trains southbound to Union Station in the morning, and 7 trains returning northbound from Union Station in the afternoon.  At other times, GO bus route 68 operates hourly to Aurora GO Station where passengers can transfer to the all-day train service to Toronto.

Weekend train service consists of 5 trains in each direction throughout the day.  GO bus route 68 also operates hourly to Aurora GO station or East Gwillimbury GO station where passengers can connect to the hourly weekend train service to Toronto.

References

External links

GO Transit railway stations
Buildings and structures in Barrie
Railway stations in Canada opened in 2007
Rail transport in Barrie
2007 establishments in Ontario
Railway stations in Simcoe County